Lisa Hamilton is an American poker player and World Series of Poker bracelet winner.

Hamilton won the 2009 WSOP $1,000 Ladies No Limit Hold'em World Championship.  In addition to the bracelet, she won the $195,390 cash prize for her victory in the tournament. This was the first career cash for Hamilton in the WSOP.

As of 2018, her total live tournament winnings exceed $1,281,900.

World Series of Poker Bracelets

References

American poker players
Female poker players
World Series of Poker bracelet winners
Living people
People from Hawaii
American sportswomen
Year of birth missing (living people)
21st-century American women